The Sunday Observance Act 1677 (29 Car 2 c 7) was an Act of the Parliament of England.

The whole Act, so far as unrepealed, was repealed by section 1(1) of, and Part IV of the Schedule to, the Statute Law (Repeals) Act 1969.

Section 6
This section was replaced by rule 10 of Order 65 of the Rules of the Supreme Court 1965 (1965 III, p. 4995), as substituted by rule 6(2) of the Rules of the Supreme Court (Amendment No. 2) 1969 (SI 1969/1894) (L 33).

References
Halsbury's Statutes,

External links
Text of the Act

Acts of the Parliament of England
1677 in law
1677 in England
Sunday